Peter Randazzo (born January 2, 1943, in Brooklyn) is an American dancer and choreographer known for his contributions to modern dance. From 1962–1968 he was a principal dancer with the Martha Graham Dance Company. In 1968 he co-founded the Toronto Dance Theatre (TDT) and its associated school, The School of Toronto Dance Theatre, with fellow Martha Graham disciples Patricia Beatty and David Earle. A prolific choreographer, the TDT has featured his works in performances internationally for more than 40 years.

References

1943 births
Living people
American choreographers
Modern dancers